Jammala is a Palestinian town in the Ramallah and al-Bireh Governorate, located 18 kilometers Northwest of Ramallah in the northern West Bank.  According to the Palestinian Central Bureau of Statistics (PCBS), the town had a population of 1,453 inhabitants in mid-year 2006.

Jammala, together with Beitillu and Deir 'Ammar, form the new town of Al-Ittihad.

Location of Al-Ittihad
Al-Itihad is bordered by Kobar and Al-Zaytouneh lands to the east, Deir Abu Mash'al, Deir Nidham  and 'Abud lands to the north, Shabtin and Deir Qaddis  to the west, and Ras Karkar, Kharbatha Bani Harith, Al-Zaytouneh and Al Janiya villages to the south.

History
Potsherds from the  Hellenistic, Roman and  Byzantine eras have been found at Jammala.

It has been suggested that this was Gemmail, mentioned in Frankish sources, but archeological evidence does not support this.

Ottoman era
Jammala  was incorporated into the Ottoman Empire in 1517 with all of Palestine, and in 1596 it appeared in the  tax registers as being in the nahiya of Al-Quds in the liwa of Al-Quds. It had a population of 22 household;   who were all Muslims. They paid a fixed  tax-rate of 33,3 % on agricultural products, including wheat, barley, olive trees, fruit trees, goats and beehives, in addition to occasional revenues; a total of 11,000 akçe.  Potsherd from the early Ottoman era have also been found here.

In 1838 Jemmala was noted as  Muslim village in the Beni Harith district, north of Jerusalem.

In May, 1870, Victor Guérin found the village, which he called Djemmala, to have 350 inhabitants. He further noted that some houses were constructed of stones, which by their size and regularity "spoke of ancient times". An Ottoman  village list from about the same year, 1870, found that the village, called Dschemali,  had  a population of 246, in a total of  36  houses, though the population count included men, only.

In 1882, the  PEF's Survey of Western Palestine  described Jemmala as: "a very small village, with a little mosque on high ground."

In 1896 the population of  Dschemali was estimated to be about 312 persons.

British Mandate era
In the 1922 census of Palestine conducted by the British Mandate authorities, Jammala  had a population of 119 Muslims, increasing in the  1931 census to 164 Muslims, in 53 houses.

In the 1945 statistics the population of Jammala was 200 Muslims, while the total land area was 7,170  dunams, according to an official land and population survey. Of  this,  1,946  were  plantations and irrigable land, 1,032  for cereals, while 19 dunams were classified as built-up areas.

Jordanian era
In the wake of the 1948 Arab–Israeli War, and after the 1949 Armistice Agreements, Jammala  came  under Jordanian rule.

The Jordanian census of 1961 found 322 inhabitants in Jammala.

1967-present
Since the Six-Day War in 1967,  Jammala  has been under  Israeli occupation. The population in the 1967 census conducted by the Israeli authorities was 268, of whom 15  originated from the Israeli territory.

After the 1995 accords, 41.2% of  Al-Ittihad land is defined as Area B land, while the remaining 58.8% is defined as Area C. Israel has confiscated 858 dunams of land from Al-Ittihad for the construction of 4 Israeli settlements: Nahl'iel, Na'aleh, Talmon and Hallamish.

References

Bibliography

External links
Welcome To Jammala
AL-Itihad Town (Fact Sheet),  Applied Research Institute–Jerusalem (ARIJ)
Al-Itihad Town Profile (Beitillu, Jammala & Deir 'Ammar), ARIJ 
Al-Itihad aerial photo, ARIJ 
Survey of Western Palestine, Map 14:  IAA, Wikimedia commons 

Villages in the West Bank
Ramallah and al-Bireh Governorate
Municipalities of the State of Palestine